Syed Tariq Hussain اردو: طارق  حسین, born 23 April 1976 in Karachi, is a Pakistani-born cricketer who played for the Oman national cricket team. He is a right-handed batsman and left-arm slow bowler. He made several appearances as a batsman for Oman national cricket team in the 2005 ICC Trophy. Up to 1996, he played first-class and List A cricket for Karachi Blues and for Pakistan National Shipping Corporation.

References

1976 births
Living people
Omani cricketers
Pakistani emigrants to Oman
Pakistani expatriates in Oman
Cricketers from Karachi
Pakistani cricketers
Pakistan National Shipping Corporation cricketers
Karachi Blues cricketers